The three parts of the English county of Lincolnshire are or were divisions of the second-largest county in England. Similar in nature to the three ridings of Yorkshire, they existed as local government units until commencement of the Local Government Act 1972.

The three parts were:

Lindsey in the north, itself traditionally divided into three ridings (North, South and West);
Kesteven in the south-west; and
Holland in the south-east.
The three parts touched in a tripoint somewhere near Chapel Hill.

Each of the parts had long had separate county administration (quarter sessions), and each was created a discrete administrative county with its own county council in 1889.

This arrangement lasted until 1974, when the three councils were replaced by a single Lincolnshire County Council, with northern Lindsey going to form part of the new County of Humberside (since abolished and replaced south of the Humber with two unitary authorities).

Although the parts no longer exist as units of local government, they are still recognised as broad geographical areas of Lincolnshire, and their names live on in some of the county's district councils (East and West Lindsey, North and South Kesteven, and South Holland).

Quarter sessions

In 1906, quarter sessions were held at Lincoln for Lindsey, at Bourne and Sleaford for Kesteven, and at Spalding and Boston for Holland.

See also
 Lathe
 Rape
 Riding
 hundred
List of hundreds of England and Wales

References

Local government in Lincolnshire
Former subdivisions of Lincolnshire
Defunct types of subdivision in the United Kingdom